Cladoptosis (Ancient Greek   "branch",   "falling" [noun]; sometimes pronounced with the p silent) is the regular shedding of branches. It is the counterpart for branches of the familiar process of regular leaf shedding by deciduous trees. As in leaf shedding, an abscission layer forms, and the branch is shed cleanly.

Functions of cladoptosis
Cladoptosis is thought to have three possible functions: self-pruning (i.e. programmed plant senescence), drought response (characteristic of xerophytes) and liana defence. 
 Self-pruning is the shedding of branches that are shaded or diseased, which are potentially a drain on the resources of the tree. 
 Drought response is similar to the leaf-fall response of drought-deciduous trees; however, leafy shoots are shed in place of leaves. Western red cedar (Thuja plicata) provides an example, as do other members of the family Cupressaceae. 
 In tropical forests, infestation of tree canopies by woody climbers or lianas can be a serious problem. Cladoptosis – by giving a clean bole with no support for climbing plants – may be an adaptation against lianas, as in the case of Castilla.

See also
Abscission
Marcescence: the opposite phenomenon – withered branches (or leaves) stay on

References

Further reading

External links
Cladoptosis in Thuja - UBC Botanical Garden

Plant physiology
Plant anatomy